Jakobsbakken (locally known as Bakken) is a clustered settlement  in the municipality of Fauske in Nordland, Norway. 

The settlement was formerly associated with the Norwegian mining company Sulitjelma Gruber. Ore deposits were discovered at the site in the mid-1870s, but systematic investigations were not carried out until 1886.  Swedish entrepreneur Nils Persson (1836–1916)  acquired eight sites at Sulitelma. In 1891 Sulitjelma Gruber  was formed. Telephone service was established in 1891 and postal service was established in 1913.

The transport of ore took place on an aerial tramway down to Sulitjelma. 
Jakobsbakken was by far the richest single deposit in Sulitjelma field. The area has numerous ore minerals, and at least 23 have been identified.
The Jakobsbakken mine operated from 1896 to 1968 during which time 4.47 million tons of copper and zinc ore were extracted. 

After the closure of the mine in 1968, the civil section was purchased by the Norwegian Lutheran Mission and the technical part was razed or walled up.

References

External links
Berg, Henrik, Nils Norum, & Odd Rørvik. Stedet Jakobsbakken. Sulitjelma: Sulitjelma historielag.

Mines in Norway
Zinc mines in Norway